1967 is remembered as one of the most notable years in Canada. It was the centenary of Canadian Confederation and celebrations were held throughout the nation. The most prominent event was Expo 67 in Montreal, the most successful World's Fair ever held up to that time, and one of the first events to win international acclaim for the country. The year saw the nation's Governor General, Georges Vanier, die in office; and two prominent federal leaders, Official Opposition Leader John Diefenbaker, and Prime Minister Lester B. Pearson announced their resignations. The year's top news-story was French President Charles de Gaulle's "Vive le Québec libre" speech in Montreal. The year also saw major changes in youth culture with the "hippies" in Toronto's Yorkville area becoming front-page news over their lifestyle choices and battles with Toronto City Council.  A new honours system was announced, the Order of Canada. In sports, the Toronto Maple Leafs won their 13th and last Stanley Cup.

In mountaineering, the year saw the first ascents of the highest peak in the remote Arctic Cordillera.

Overview 
The nation began to feel far more nationalistic than before, with a generation raised in a country fully detached from Britain. The new Canadian flag served as a symbol and a catalyst for this. In Quebec, the Quiet Revolution was overthrowing the oligarchy of francophone clergy and anglophone businessmen, and French Canadian pride and nationalism were becoming a national political force.

The Canadian economy was at its post-war peak, and levels of prosperity and quality of life were at all-time highs. Many of the most important elements of Canada's welfare state were coming on line, such as Medicare and the Canada Pension Plan (CPP).

These events were coupled with the coming of age of the baby boom and the regeneration of music, literature, and art that the 1960s brought around the world. The baby boomers, who have since dominated Canada's culture, tend to view the period as Canada's halcyon days.

1967 was an exciting year for Canadians. Communities across the country planned celebrations to mark the 100th anniversary of confederation. The Federal Government sponsored events from coast to coast and provided funding and organization for such things as the Centennial Train and the Centennial Voyageur Canoe Pageant. Even Canada's military got the spirit by producing the Canadian Armed Forces Tattoo 1967 that toured the country from coast to coast with over 150 shows from St. John's, Newfoundland to Victoria, BC with a two week long production at EXPO 67 in Montreal. Tattoo 1967 was so successful, there were calls to have the show tour the world as a representative of Canadian culture. The show set a world's record for the longest running military tattoo, a record that has never been equaled.

While to Montreal it was the year of Expo, to Toronto it was the culmination of the Toronto Maple Leafs dynasty of the 1960s, with the team winning its fourth Stanley Cup in six years by defeating its arch-rival, the Montreal Canadiens, in the last all-Canadian Stanley Cup Final until 1986.

Author and historian Pierre Berton famously referred to 1967 as Canada's last good year. In his analysis, the years following saw much of 1967's hopefulness disappear. In the early 1970s, the oil shock and other factors hammered the Canadian economy. Quebec separatism led to divisive debates and an economic decline of Montreal and Front de libération du Québec (FLQ) terrorism. The Vietnam War and Watergate Scandal in the United States also had profound effects on Canadians. Berton reported that Toronto hockey fans also note that the Maple Leafs have not won a Stanley Cup since.

Incumbents

Crown 
 Monarch – Elizabeth II

Federal government 
 Governor General – Georges Vanier (until March 5) then Roland Michener (from April 17)
 Prime Minister – Lester B. Pearson 
 Chief Justice – Robert Taschereau (Quebec) (until September 1) then John Robert Cartwright (Ontario)
 Parliament – 27th

Provincial governments

Lieutenant governors 
Lieutenant Governor of Alberta – Grant MacEwan  
Lieutenant Governor of British Columbia – George Pearkes 
Lieutenant Governor of Manitoba – Richard Spink Bowles 
Lieutenant Governor of New Brunswick – John B. McNair 
Lieutenant Governor of Newfoundland – Fabian O'Dea 
Lieutenant Governor of Nova Scotia – Henry Poole MacKeen  
Lieutenant Governor of Ontario – William Earl Rowe 
Lieutenant Governor of Prince Edward Island – Willibald Joseph MacDonald 
Lieutenant Governor of Quebec – Hugues Lapointe 
Lieutenant Governor of Saskatchewan – Robert Hanbidge

Premiers 
Premier of Alberta – Ernest Manning   
Premier of British Columbia – W.A.C. Bennett 
Premier of Manitoba – Dufferin Roblin (until November 27) then Walter Weir  
Premier of New Brunswick – Louis Robichaud 
Premier of Newfoundland – Joey Smallwood 
Premier of Nova Scotia – Robert Stanfield (until September 13) then G.I. Smith  
Premier of Ontario – John Robarts 
Premier of Prince Edward Island – Alexander B. Campbell 
Premier of Quebec – Daniel Johnson, Sr. 
Premier of Saskatchewan – Ross Thatcher

Territorial governments

Commissioners 
 Commissioner of Yukon – James Smith 
 Commissioner of Northwest Territories – Bent Gestur Sivertz (until March 2) then Stuart Milton Hodgson

Events

January to June
January 1: Several municipalities such as Forest Hill and Swansea are merged into Toronto
January 7: Robert Nixon is elected leader of the Ontario Liberal Party
March 25: After the death of Georges Vanier, Roland Michener becomes Governor General
April 17: The Order of Canada is created
April 27: Expo 67 Official Opening Ceremony broadcast in colour live via satellite to an estimated worldwide audience of 700 million viewers and listeners.
April 28: Expo 67 opens to the public at 9:30 a.m. in Montreal
April: Bill C-243, The Canadian Forces Reorganization Act, is given third and final reading in the House of Commons 
May: The GO Transit service begins in Toronto
May 23: Alberta election: Ernest Manning's Social Credit Party wins a ninth consecutive majority
June 5: Geoffrey Hattersley-Smith becomes the first person to climb Barbeau Peak, the highest point in the Arctic Cordillera
June 20: The National Library of Canada opens

July to December

July 1: Canada celebrates its centennial
July 24: During an official state visit to Canada, French President Charles de Gaulle declares to a crowd of over 100,000 in Montreal: Vive le Québec libre! (Long live free Quebec!). The statement, interpreted as support for Quebec independence, delighted many francophone Quebecers but angered the Canadian government and many English Canadians and was voted as the top news story from Canada by newspaper and radio journalists.
July 30: The Caribbean community in Toronto stages the first Caribana, with only eight bands and 1,000 spectators. It later grows into the third largest carnival in the world, drawing over 1 million spectators and 250,000 visitors a year.
August 5: A man with schizophrenia, Victor Hoffman, kills nine near Shell Lake, Saskatchewan
September 9: Robert Stanfield wins the leadership of the Progressive Conservative Party
September 13: G.I. Smith becomes premier of Nova Scotia, replacing Robert Stanfield
October 11: Saskatchewan election: Ross Thatcher's Liberals win a second consecutive majority
October 14: René Lévesque quits the Quebec Liberal Party and leaves to form the Mouvement Souveraineté-Association
October 17: Ontario election: John Robarts's PCs win a seventh consecutive majority
October 29: Expo 67 closes, setting attendance records.
November 5: Robert Stanfield becomes head of the federal Progressive Conservative Party
November 16: The Museum of Science and Technology opens in Ottawa
November 27: Walter Weir becomes premier of Manitoba, replacing Dufferin Roblin
November 27: A conference organized by John Robarts of Ontario brings together all the provincial premiers to discuss the constitution
December 14: Lester B. Pearson announces he will step down as prime minister early in the next year
December 27: Justice Minister Pierre Trudeau proposes sweeping reforms that will, among other things, decriminalize homosexual acts.
December 29: Royal Commission on Bilingualism and Biculturalism delivers first volume its report.

Full date unknown
Mary Walker-Sawka becomes the first woman to be nominated as a candidate for the leadership of a federal political party.
The University of Lethbridge is founded

Arts and literature

New books
Morley Callaghan: Stories
Timothy Findley: The Last of the Crazy People
Hugh Hood: The Camera Always Lies
Farley Mowat: The Polar Passion

Poetry
 Margaret Atwood, The Circle Game, won a Governor General's award and "sold out immediately"
 John Robert Colombo, Abracadabra
 D. G. Jones, Phrases from Orpheus
 Dorothy Livesay, The Unquiet Bed, Canadian and African experiences
 Eli Mandel, An Idiot Joy
 Michael Ondaatje, The Dainty Monsters, Toronto: Coach House Press
 P. K. Page, Cry Ararat!: Poems New and Selected
 Al Purdy, North of Summer, a diary in verse recounting his stay on Baffin Island
 A. J. M. Smith:
 Editor, A Book of Modern Canadian Verse, anthology
 Poems: New and Collected
 Raymond Souster, editor, New Wave Canada anthology of younger poets
 Miriam Waddington, The Glass Trumpet
 George Woodcock, Selected Poems of George Woodcock, Toronto: Clarke, Irwin, Canada

Awards
See 1967 Governor General's Awards for a complete list of winners and finalists for those awards.
Stephen Leacock Award: Richard J. Needham, Needham's Inferno
Vicky Metcalf Award: John Patrick Gillese

Film
Norman Jewison's In the Heat of the Night premieres
Michael Snow's Wavelength premieres and starts the structural film movement.

Sport
March 11 – The Toronto Varsity Blues win their second University Cup by defeating the Laurentian Voyageurs 16 to 2. The final game is played at Edmonton Gardens
May 2 – The Toronto Maple Leafs win their 13th (and last  to date) Stanley Cup by defeating the Montreal Canadiens. The deciding Game 7 was played at Maple Leaf Gardens in Toronto. Noranda, Quebec's Dave Keon won the Conn Smythe Trophy
May 11 – The Ontario Hockey Association's Toronto Marlboros win their fifth Memorial Cup by defeating the Thunder Bay Junior Hockey League's Port Arthur Marrs 4 games to 1. All the games were played at Fort William Gardens
July 23 – The fifth Pan American Games commence in Winnipeg.
November 25 – The Alberta Golden Bears win their first Vanier Cup by defeating the McMaster Marauders 10–9 in the 3rd Vanier Cup played at Varsity Stadium in Toronto
December 2 – The Hamilton Tiger-Cats win their fifth Grey Cup by defeating Saskatchewan Roughriders 24 to 1 in the 55th Grey Cup played at Lansdowne Park in Ottawa.

Births

January to March
January 27 – Susan Aglukark, singer-songwriter
January 29 – Sean Burke, ice hockey player
February 26 – Gene Principe, sports reporter
March 16 – Kevin Draxinger, swimmer

April to June
April 5 – Gary Gait, lacrosse player
April 5 – Paul Gait, lacrosse player and coach
April 14
 Steve Chiasson, Canadian ice hockey player (d. 1999)
 Alain Côté, Canadian ice hockey player
April 29 – Curtis Joseph, ice hockey player
May 1 – Tom Hanson, photojournalist (d. 2009)
May 1 – Marie Moore, swimmer
May 4 – John Child, beach volleyball player and Olympic bronze medalist
May 5 – Stephane Provost, National Hockey League linesman (d. 2005)
May 10 – Scott Brison, politician and Minister
May 15 – Ron Pardo, actor and comedian
May 21 – Chris Benoit, wrestler (d. 2007)
May 25 – Andrew Sznajder, tennis player
May 29 – Mike Keane, ice hockey player
June 1 – Murray Baron, ice hockey player
June 10 – Elizabeth Wettlaufer, nurse and serial killer
June 24 – Bill Huard, ice hockey player
June 27 – Sylvie Fréchette, synchronized swimmer and Olympic gold medalist
June 28 – Gil Bellows, film and television actor
June 30 – Gareth Rees, rugby union player

July to December
July 1 – Pamela Anderson, actress, glamour model, producer, author and activist
July 7 – Andy Walker, television personality
July 12 – Bruny Surin, sprinter, Olympic gold medalist and World Champion
August 6 – Julie Snyder, TV host and producer
August 12 – Pascale Grand, racewalker
August 21 – Carrie-Anne Moss, actress
August 23 – Jody Vance, sports anchor
September 1 – David Whissell, politician
September 17 – Kevin Boyles, volleyball player and coach
September 25 – Kim Issel, Canadian ice hockey player
September 30 – Paul Boyd, American-born Canadian animator (d. 2007)
October 3 – Denis Villeneuve, film director and writer
October 9 – Carling Bassett-Seguso, tennis player
October 9 – Guylaine Dumont, beach volleyball player
October 17 – Venus Terzo, actress and voice actress
October 30 – Brad Aitken, ice hockey player
November 8 – Christopher Chalmers, swimmer
December 14 – Dominic LeBlanc, politician
December 15 – Christine Larsen, synchronised swimmer
December 16 – Donovan Bailey, sprinter, double Olympic gold medalist and World Champion
December 17 – Vincent Damphousse, ice hockey player
December 29 – Ashleigh Banfield, journalist and television host

Deaths 
January 9 – Errick Willis, politician (b.1896)
January 14 – James Lorimer Ilsley, politician, Minister and jurist (b.1894)
January 26 – Crawford Gordon, businessman (b.1914)
January 31 – Geoffrey O'Hara, composer, singer and music professor (b.1882)
February 10 – Thomas Ricketts, soldier and Victoria Cross recipient in 1918 (b.1901)
March 5 – Georges Vanier, soldier, diplomat and Governor General of Canada (b.1888)
March 23 - Jack Humphrey, painter (b.1901)
April 20 - Léo-Paul Desrosiers, journalist, writer (b.1896)
April 30 – Gladys Porter, politician and first female Member of the Legislative Assembly of Nova Scotia (b.1894)
May 13 – Dana Porter, politician and jurist (b.1901)
May 23 – Lionel Groulx, priest, historian, Quebec nationalist and traditionalist (b.1878)
August 2 – Adrien Arcand, journalist and fascist (b.1899)
August 28 - Charles Edward Bothwell, politician and barrister (b.1882)
December 30 – Vincent Massey, lawyer, diplomat and Governor General of Canada (b.1887)

Full date unknown 
Malcolm Norris, Métis leader (b.1900)

See also 
 1967 in Canadian television
 List of Canadian films

References

Citations

Bibliography

See also 
 1967 in Canadian television
 List of Canadian films

External links 
Canadian Armed Forces Tattoo 1967
NFB documentary, Summer of '67 (includes info on upcoming Canadian screenings)
Centennial Ontario, online exhibit on Archives of Ontario website

 
Years of the 20th century in Canada
Canada
1967 in North America